Alberto de Castro Guedes (born August 13, 1951) is a Brazilian singer, songwriter, and guitarist.

Biography
Beto Guedes has been playing in bands since he was a teenager. When he was 18 years old he took part in the V Singers International Festival, with the song "Feira Moderna" composed jointly with Fernando Brant. He formed the musical group Clube da Esquina with Milton Nascimento, Lô Borges, and Fernando Brant.  The Minas Gerais folk music tradition was the group's main influence, along with 1960s rock and choro. His next band was 14 Bis. In 1977 he recorded his first album, A Página do Relâmpago Elétrico, which was an unexpected success. In 1978 he issued the LP Amor de Índio, whose title song was Guedes's biggest career success.

Discography
 Beto Guedes, Danilo Caymmi, Novelli, Toninho Horta (Odeon, 1973)
 A Página do Relâmpago Elétrico (EMI, 1977)
 Amor de Índio (EMI, 1978)
 Sol de Primavera (EMI, 1979)
 Contos da Lua Vaga (EMI, 1981)
 Viagem das Mãos (EMI, 1984)
 Alma de Borracha (EMI, 1986)
 Beto Guedes Ao Vivo (EMI, 1987)
 Andaluz (EMI, 1991)
 Dias de Paz (Epic, 1999)
 50 Anos Ao Vivo (Epic, 2002)
 Em Algum Lugar (Epic, 2004)
 Outros Clássicos - Beto Guedes Ao Vivo (Biscoito Fino, 2010)

See also
 Flávio Venturini
 Lô Borges
 Clube da Esquina

References

External links
 Lyrics
 Lyrics: Amor de índio
 Lyrics: O medo de amar
 Lyrics: Lágrima de Amor

1951 births
Living people
Brazilian guitarists
Brazilian male guitarists
Brazilian singer-songwriters
Brazilian rock singers
Música Popular Brasileira guitarists
Música Popular Brasileira singers
Brazilian male singer-songwriters
Culture in Minas Gerais